Joseph Eugene Batten (January 23, 1972 – July 29, 2008), a video game programmer, murdered his estranged wife Melissa Brooks Batten (March 2, 1972 – July 29, 2008), also a software development engineer, in Redmond, Washington, United States. She had taken out an order of protection against her husband on July 21, eight days before he murdered her.

Biography

Early lives and education
Melissa Brooks Batten, the victim, was a Harvard Law graduate. Joseph Batten was born January 23, 1972, in Parkersburg, West Virginia. Joseph got his mathematics degree from Marshall University.

Careers
Melissa worked as a public defender in North Carolina from 2000-2002, handling domestic cases. At the time, she worked for the Mecklenburg County, North Carolina Public Defender's Office. Melissa moved to Washington state in 2002, and soon after got a job at Microsoft Game Studios, where Joseph was already working as a video game programmer. Melissa earned credits on Halo 3 and Gears of War as a Software Development Engineer in Test, and was working in support of Xbox 360 developer Rare. Joseph later worked at Wizards of the Coast as a Senior Project Manager. Joseph was also the head of the Gleemax project; on July 28, 2008, Wizards announced that they were shutting down Gleemax to concentrate on Dungeons & Dragons Insider.

The Battens lived together in Kent, Washington.

Murder-suicide
On June 5, 2008, after finding out about an affair Melissa had, Joseph confronted her and at one point he pointed a gun at her, and then at his own head. Melissa moved into a friend's apartment in Redmond, Washington, soon after, but he found out where she was living. A mutual friend persuaded him to sell his .22-caliber handgun back to the dealer, but he later bought two more guns, a .357 Smith & Wesson revolver and a 9-millimeter Taurus semiautomatic. Joseph broke into her workplace at Microsoft on July 16 while she was out of town, and was banished from the campus after he was caught by security guards. Melissa told police that he called her more than 20 times on July 19 and 20. Melissa got a protection order against Joseph on July 21, which said he could not come within 100 yards of her, and was served to him on July 25. She was in the process of filing for divorce.

Shortly after 9 AM on July 29, 2008, Melissa left the apartment to go to work. Joseph approached her in the parking lot and shot her several times in the torso with a 9-mm handgun, and then shot himself in the head. Investigators found fuzzy handcuffs, hardcore pornography, an 8-inch cutting knife, plus $6,000 in cash in the trunk of Joseph's Mercedes sedan. Microsoft provided grief counseling to Melissa's surviving relatives, and helped organize memorials for family and colleagues. Washington state legislator Roger Goodman cited the Batten case in the passage of a 2014 state gun control law that involved domestic violence.

See also
Gun laws in Washington (state)

References

1972 births
2008 deaths
2008 in Washington (state)
2008 murders in the United States
American murder victims
Harvard Law School alumni
Married couples
Marshall University alumni
Murder–suicides in the United States
People from Kent, Washington
People from Parkersburg, West Virginia
Video game programmers
Violence against women in the United States